Small Medium Enterprise Development Bank Malaysia Berhad, commonly known as SME Bank is a Malaysian small and medium enterprise (SME) banking company owned by Minister of Finance Incorporated. The bank's main activity is to provide financial assistance and expertise to small and medium enterprises. Aria Putera Ismail is the CEO of the bank since 3 September 2018.

See also
 List of banks in Malaysia

References

External links
 

Banks of Malaysia
Banks established in 2005
2005 establishments in Malaysia
Companies based in Kuala Lumpur
Minister of Finance (Incorporated) (Malaysia)